Myat Ko is a current Chief Minister of Tanintharyi Region, Myanmar. He also served as Chief Minister of Tanintharyi Region from 2012 to 2016.

A member of the Union Solidarity and Development Party, he was elected to represent Dawei Township Constituency No. 2 as a Taninthayi Region Hluttaw representative in the 2010 Burmese general election. Previously serving as the region's Minister of Finance, he was appointed by President Thein Sein to Chief Minister on 27 January 2012. He replaced Khin Zaw, who had resigned as Chief Minister on 6 January 2012, citing health problems.

References

Government ministers of Myanmar
Union Solidarity and Development Party politicians
Living people
Year of birth missing (living people)